Imbagedo is a reservoir located in the Inderta woreda of the Tigray Region in Ethiopia. The earthen dam that holds the reservoir was built in 1998 by SAERT.

Dam characteristics 
 Dam height: 20 metres
 Dam crest length: 328 metres
 Spillway width: 20 metres

Capacity 
 Original capacity: 1 776 278 m³
 Dead storage: 360 000 m³
 Reservoir area: 36 ha
In 2002, the life expectancy of the reservoir (the duration before it is filled with sediment) was estimated at 24 years.

Irrigation 
 Designed irrigated area: 80 ha

Environment 
The catchment of the reservoir is 12.4 km² large. The reservoir suffers from rapid siltation. Part of the water that could be used for irrigation is lost through seepage; the positive side-effect is that this contributes to groundwater recharge.

References 

Reservoirs in Ethiopia
1998 establishments in Ethiopia
Tigray Region